{{Infobox radio station
| name             = KYCC / KCJH / KYCM
| logo             = KYCC_radio_station_logo.png
| city             = KYCC: Stockton, CaliforniaKCJH: Livingston, CaliforniaKYCM: Alamogordo, New Mexico
| area             = KYCC: StocktonKCJH: Fresno/Visalia, CaliforniaKYCM: Alamogordo, New Mexico
| branding         =
| frequency        = KYCC: 90.1 MHzKCJH: 89.1 MHzKYCM: 89.9 MHz
| airdate          = KYCC: February 24, 1975KCJH: 1997KYCM: 2006
| format           = Christian music
| erp              = KYCC: 41,000 wattsKCJH: 13,500 wattsKYCM: 800 watts
| haat             = KYCC: 107 metersKCJH: 93 metersKYCM: 497 meters
| class            = KYCC: BKCJH: B1KYCM: C3
| facility_id      = KYCC: 63464KCJH: 63466KYCM: 93483
| coordinates      = KYCC: KCJH: KYCM: 
| callsign_meaning = KYCC: Your Christian Companion| former_callsigns = 
| affiliations     = 
| owner            = Your Christian Companion Network, Inc.
| licensee         = 
| sister_stations  = 
| webcast          = Listen Live
| website          = kycc.org
}}KYCC 90.1 FM, KCJH 89.1 FM, and KYCM''' 89.9 FM are radio stations broadcasting a Christian music format. Licensed respectively to Stockton, California, Livingston, California, and Alamogordo, New Mexico the stations are currently owned by Your Christian Companion Network, Inc. The station also has several satellites and repeaters throughout the western US.

Additional frequencies
In addition to the main station, KYCC is relayed by these stations and translators to widen its broadcast area.

External links

YCC